Fangzi is a district of the city of Weifang, Shandong province, China.

Administrative divisions
As 2012, this district is divided to 4 subdistricts and 2 towns.
Subdistricts
Fenghuang Subdistrict
Fang'an Subdistrict
Fangcheng Subdistrict
Jiulong Subdistrict

Towns
Huangqibao
Taibaozhuang

References

External links 
 Information page

County-level divisions of Shandong
Weifang